In biological nomenclature, a syntype is any one of two or more biological types that is listed in a description of a taxon where no holotype was designated. Precise definitions of this and related terms for types have been established as part of the International Code of Zoological Nomenclature and the International Code of Nomenclature for algae, fungi, and plants.

In zoology
In zoological nomenclature, a syntype is defined as "Each specimen of a type series (q.v.) from which neither a holotype nor a lectotype has been designated [Arts. 72.1.2, 73.2, 74]. The syntypes collectively constitute the name-bearing type." (Glossary of the zoological Code ).

Historically, syntypes were often explicitly designated as such, and under the present ICZN this is a requirement (Art. 72.3), but modern attempts to publish species or subspecies descriptions based on syntypes are generally frowned upon by practicing taxonomists, and most are gradually being replaced by lectotypes. Those that still exist are still considered name-bearing types. A lectotype may be designated from among the syntypes, reducing the other specimens to the status of paralectotype. They are no longer name-bearing types, though if the lectotype is lost or destroyed, it is generally preferable to use a paralectotype as a replacement (neotype). Where specimens in a syntype series are found to belong to different taxa, this may cause nomenclatural instability, since the nominal species can be interpreted in different ways.

In botany
In botanical nomenclature, a syntype can be made in the description of a species or an infraspecific taxon. It is defined as "any specimen cited in the protologue when there is no holotype, or any one of two or more specimens simultaneously designated as types." (Art. 9.5).

See also 
 Type (biology)

References

Zoological nomenclature
Botanical nomenclature